Justice Mehr Chand Mahajan (1889–1967) was the third Chief Justice of the Supreme Court of India. Prior to that he was the Prime Minister of the state of Jammu and Kashmir during the reign of Maharaja Hari Singh and played a key role in the accession of the state to India. He was the Indian National Congress nominee on the Radcliffe Commission that defined the boundaries of India and Pakistan.

Justice Mahajan made his name as an accomplished lawyer, a respected judge, and an influential politician. As a judge he was incisive and forthright and had many leading judgements to his credit.

Early life 
Mehr Chand Mahajan was born on 23 December 1889 at Tika Nagrota in the Kangra district of Punjab, British India (now In Himachal Pradesh). His father, Lala Brij Lal, was an advocate, who later established a reputed legal practice at Dharmsala.

After completing middle school, Mahajan went to study in the Government College, Lahore, graduating in 1910. He enrolled in M.Sc. Chemistry, but switched to law following persuasion from his father. He earned an LL.B. degree in 1912.

Career as a lawyer 
Mahajan started his career as a lawyer in 1913 in Dharamsala, where he spent a year practising. He spent the next four years (1914-1918) as a lawyer in Gurdaspur. He then practiced law in Lahore from 1918 to 1943. During his time there, he served as president of the High Court Bar Association of Lahore (1938 to 1943).

Justice of Punjab High Court 

He became a Justice in the pre-independence Punjab High Court. While he was serving there, the Maharaja of Jammu and Kashmir called him to become his Prime Minister for the negotiations regarding merger with India.

Prime Minister of Jammu and Kashmir
Mahajan visited Kashmir on invitation of the Maharani in September 1947 and was asked to be the Prime Minister of Jammu and Kashmir which he accepted. On 15 October 1947, Mahajan was appointed the Prime Minister of Jammu & Kashmir and played a role in the accession of the state to India. Jammu & Kashmir acceded to India in October 1947 and  Mahajan thus became the 1st Prime Minister of the Indian state of Jammu and Kashmir, serving in that post until 5 March 1948.

Chief Justice, Supreme Court of India 
Mahajan took office as the third Chief Justice of India on 4 January 1954. He was the head of India's judicial system for almost a year, until his retirement on 22 December 1954 (mandatory retirement at age 65). Before becoming Chief Justice he served as one of the first Judges of the Supreme Court of independent India from 4 October 1948 to 3 January 1954.

Other positions of note 
 Director, Punjab National Bank, 1933–43
 Pres. D.A.V. College, Managing Committee, 1938–43
 Fellow and Syndic, Punjab University, 1940–47
 Judge, Lahore High Court, 1943
 All India Fruit Products Association Bombay Session, 1945
 Member, R.I.N. Mutiny Commission, 1946
 1947 Dewan of Jammu and Kashmir State 1947-48
 Judge, East Punjab High Court
 Punjab Boundary Commission, 1947
 Syndic, East Punjab University, 1947–50
 Constitutional Adviser to His Highness the Maharaja of Bikaner, 1948
 Hon. Degree of LL.D., Punjab University; 1948
 Member, Fruit Development Board, Punjab
 Commission on Belgaum (dispute between Karnataka and Maharashtra), 1967

References

External links
 Mehr Chand Mahajan

Chief justices of India
1889 births
1967 deaths
People from Kangra, Himachal Pradesh
Chief Ministers of Jammu and Kashmir (princely state)
Indian National Congress politicians
20th-century Indian lawyers
20th-century Indian judges
People of the 1947 Kashmir conflict